James Louis Oberstar (September 10, 1934 – May 3, 2014) was an American politician who served in the United States House of Representatives from 1975 to 2011. A member of the Minnesota Democratic–Farmer–Labor Party, he represented northeastern , which included the cities of Duluth, Brainerd, Grand Rapids, International Falls, and Hibbing. He was chairman of the House Transportation and Infrastructure Committee from 2007 to 2011, and ranking minority member prior to that. In November 2010, he was defeated by a margin of 4,407 votes by Republican Chip Cravaack. He is the longest-serving member ever of the United States House of Representatives from the state of Minnesota.

Early life, education and career
Oberstar was born in Chisholm, Minnesota, and at his deathbed still owned his original family home in Chisholm. His father Louis, of German ancestry, was an iron ore miner and the first card-carrying member of the USW on the Iron Range of Minnesota. Oberstar also had some Slovenian ancestry.

Oberstar graduated from Chisholm High School in 1952, and went on to the College of St. Thomas (now the University of St. Thomas) in St. Paul, Minnesota where he received his B.A. degree in 1956. He received a master's degree in European Studies from the College of Europe in Bruges, Belgium in 1957, with further study at Université Laval in Sainte-Foy, Quebec, Canada and Georgetown University in Washington, D.C.

He spent four years as a civilian language teacher in the United States Marine Corps, teaching English to Haitian military personnel and French to American Marine officers and noncommissioned officers.

He served on the staff of Minnesota's 8th District U.S. Representative John Blatnik for 12 years, from 1963 to 1974, rising to chief of staff. He was also administrator of the Committee on Public Works for the U.S. House of Representatives from 1971 to 1974.

U.S. House of Representatives
Oberstar was first elected as a Democrat to the 94th Congress and was reelected to 17 succeeding Congresses; serving from January 3, 1975, to January 3, 2011.

He was an internationally recognized expert on aviation and aviation safety. He served on the Transportation and Infrastructure Committee during his entire time in the House. (His predecessor Blatnik had chaired the committee during his last two terms in Congress when it was known as the Public Works Committee, with Oberstar as staff administrator). He was also a member of the President's Commission on Aviation Security and Terrorism.

In 1965, Oberstar helped create the Economic Development Administration, the only federal agency devoted to the creation and retention of jobs in economically distressed American communities.

Oberstar was a strong supporter of the Duluth-based aircraft manufacturer Cirrus Aircraft, and even helped bring the company to Minnesota in 1994 from its first home in Baraboo, Wisconsin. That same year, he assisted in passing the General Aviation Revitalization Act, which was said to have reinvigorated the general aviation industry nationwide.

An avid cyclist, Oberstar championed the creation of trails for cycling and hiking to promote active lifestyles. In 2005 he authored, co-sponsored and helped to pass the SAFETEA-LU act, a $295 billion program that funds transportation infrastructure, including highways, bridges, and public transportation, such as subways, buses, and passenger ferries and which includes the Safe Routes to Schools program. At both the 2007 BikeWalk California conference and at other bicycling conferences, Oberstar advocated converting the U.S.'s transportation system "from a hydrocarbon-based system to a carbohydrate-based system."

Oberstar generally had a liberal voting record, but opposed abortion and gun control. The latter stand was fairly common among DFLers outside the Twin Cities, as Minnesota is a "pioneer state" with a long hunting and fishing tradition. Oberstar was the co-chairman of the Congressional Pro-Life Caucus, along with Republican Chris Smith of New Jersey. In 2007, Oberstar was one of 16 Democrats who voted against federal funding for stem cell research.

He was rated the third most liberal member of the Minnesota delegation in the 109th Congress, scoring 13% conservative by a conservative group and 86% progressive by a liberal group. Minnesota Congressional Districts shows the scores for the entire delegation.

Along with John Conyers, in April 2006 Oberstar brought an action against George W. Bush and others alleging violations of the U.S. Constitution in the passing of the Deficit Reduction Act of 2005. The case, (Conyers v. Bush), was ultimately dismissed.

Within days after the collapse of the I-35W Mississippi River bridge, Oberstar introduced and succeeded in passing legislation to appropriate $250 million to the Minnesota Department of Transportation to quickly build a replacement bridge.

In 2004 Oberstar led the opposition to the Commercial Space Launch Amendments Act of 2004, a bill that established a regulatory framework for private suborbital spaceflight, arguing that the bill did not sufficiently safeguard passenger and crew safety. "I do not want to see people dead from a space experiment, and then the federal government comes in to regulate".

During his tenure in Congress, Oberstar held leadership positions on the House Transportation and Infrastructure committee, was House Democratic At-Large Whip, and a member of the Executive Committee of the Democratic Study Group. He also served on the International Relations Committee. He was co-chair of the Great Lakes Task Force and was a member of the Upper Mississippi Task Force and the Democratic Homeland Security Task Force. He co-chaired the Congressional Travel and Tourism Caucus and was a member of the following caucuses: the Bike Caucus; the Caucus for Sustainable Development; the Congressional Caucus on Global Road Safety; the Congressional Human Rights Caucus; the Congressional Steel Caucus; the Medical Technology Caucus; the Mississippi River Caucus; the Native American Caucus and the Renewable Energy Caucus.

Awards and honors

In 2009, Oberstar received the Tony Jannus Award for distinguished leadership in the field of commercial aviation.

In May 2011, a Great Lakes ore carrier, of the Interlake Steamship Company, which typically transports taconite pellets from Duluth, Silver Bay and Marquette to steel mills near Detroit, Cleveland, and Chicago, was renamed after him, dubbed the MV Honorable James L. Oberstar.

On June 19, 2012, Oberstar was made Commander in the French Ordre national du Mérite.

In October 2015, the new passenger terminal of the Duluth International Airport was named in honor of Oberstar, who helped secure funding for the facility prior to its 2013 opening. A sculpture of him was also unveiled during the renamed terminal's introduction.

In 2016, he was posthumously inducted into the Minnesota Aviation Hall of Fame.

Political positions
Abortion
Oberstar was an anti-abortion Democrat. He showed his full support in 2005–2006 to the National Right to Life Committee (NRLC). However, he believed abortion should be allowed if the pregnancy resulted from incest or rape or when the life of the woman is endangered.

Education
Oberstar was a strong supporter of the Head Start Program, which is a national program from the Department of Health and Human Services to promote school readiness by enhancing social and cognitive development of children through the provision of educational, health, nutritional, social, and other services. He considered it to be one of the most successful federal anti-poverty programs ever created. Oberstar also supported the American Association of University Women (AAUW), which has been a leading voice promoting education and equality for women and girls nationwide; he fully supported the AAUW in 2007 and 2008. Interest groups, like American Association of University Women (AAUW) and the National Association of Elementary School Principals (NAESP), gave him 100 points support. In the early 1980s, Oberstar gave federal support to the establishment of the Natural Resources Research Institute at the University of Minnesota Duluth to provide applied research and technology development to Minnesota's natural resource based economy.

Environment
Oberstar was given a rating of 100 by the Environment America and the League of Conservation Voters in 2009. The American Wind Energy Association also gave him a rating of 100 in 2006. He voted to pass the Energy and Environmental Law Amendments which had the goal of establishing a program to regulate greenhouse gas emissions in 2009. He also voted to pass a bill, Trade-in Vouchers for Fuel-Efficient Cars, in 2009 which granted a $3,500 voucher, or document that could be exchanged for services in the place of money, for trading in an old vehicle with at least 4 miles per gallon more, the purpose of which was to increase the purchasing of fuel efficient cars. However, Oberstar went against most Democrats and voted in favor of allowing drilling in ANWR.

Labor
According to his voting record and interest group ratings, Oberstar was a supporter of labor. He was given a rating of 100 by the interest groups AFL-CIO, a voluntary group of labor-unions working to improve the lives of working families. Oberstar was also given a rating of 92 by the American Federation of Government in 2009 and a rating of 90 by the group, Federally Employed Women in 2009. He voted for three unemployment benefits extension bills in 2010 as well as three Employment Discrimination Law Amendments in 2009.

Taxation
According to Minnesota Congressional Election 2008 Political Courage Test, Oberstar supported having taxes on corporate earnings, gasoline and cigarettes. In 2008, Americans For Fair Taxation (AFFT), gave Oberstar their lowest possible rating, and the National Taxpayers Union gave Oberstar an "F".

He supported a tax plan containing tax relief for working families, investment tax credits for small businesses, and support for the states including incentives for transportation construction projects that will immediately put people back to work.

Trade
Oberstar did not support free trade agreements, such as North American Free Trade Agreement (NAFTA), the Central American Free Trade Agreement (CAFTA). He believed that the free trading offers little or no economic opportunity for American workers and producers due to inadequate provisions contained in the agreements.

Political campaigns
When John Blatnik opted not to run for a 15th term in 1974, he endorsed Oberstar as his successor. Oberstar won and was reelected 16 times without serious difficulty. Democrats Blatnik and Oberstar held the seat from 1947 until 2011. Oberstar's lowest winning percentage was 59 percent in 1992, but after that, and until 2010, he did not earn less than 60 percent of the vote. He is the longest-serving member of either house of Congress in Minnesota's history, having served in the 94th through the 111th Congresses; from January 3, 1975 to January 3, 2011.

During the 2008 electoral campaign, Oberstar appeared alongside other public officials in a TV ad supporting the reelection of Puerto Rico Governor Aníbal Acevedo Vilá, a fellow Democrat.

During the 2006 elections, Oberstar's Republican opponent was former United States Senator Rod Grams, whose home is in the southwestern corner of the 8th. Grams was by far the strongest opponent Oberstar had ever faced, and the first reasonably well-funded Republican to run in the 8th in decades. Although some polls showed Oberstar only ahead by two points, in the end he won by over 30 points and did not lose a single county in his district.

During the 2008 elections, Oberstar's Republican opponent was political neophyte and businessman Michael Cummins. Cummins campaigned throughout the district, but was unable to drum up enough support to pose a serious challenge to the veteran Democratic incumbent. Oberstar won with more than 67 percent of the vote.

During the 2010 elections, Oberstar lost a close race to political newcomer and Tea Party favorite, Chip Cravaack, who won a plurality of 48 percent of the vote. The race was seen nationwide as a major upset for Democrats.

Electoral history
2010

2008

2006

2004

2002

2000

1998

1996

1994

1992

 1992 DFL Primary for U.S. Representative – 8th District
 Jim Oberstar (DFL) (inc.), 78%
 Leonard J. Richards (DFL), 22%

1990

1988

1986

1984

 1984 DFL Primary for U.S. Representative – 8th District
 Jim Oberstar (DFL) (inc.), 65%
 Tom Dougherty (DFL), 33%

1982

 1982 DFL Primary for U.S. Representative – 8th District
 Jim Oberstar (DFL) (inc.), 87%
 Bernard Sydow (DFL), 13%

1980

 1980 DFL Primary for U.S. Representative – 8th District
 Jim Oberstar (DFL) (inc.), 49%
 Thomas E. Dougherty (DFL), 39%

1978

1976

1974

 1974 DFL Primary for U.S. Representative – 8th District
 Jim Oberstar (DFL), 49%
 Tony Perpich (DFL), 29%
 Florian Chmielewski (DFL), 19.5%

Personal life
Oberstar resided with his wife, Jean, in Potomac, Maryland, a suburb of Washington, D.C., and maintained his boyhood residence in Chisholm, Minnesota. He died in his sleep at his home in Potomac on May 3, 2014, four months before his 80th birthday. He was  survived by 4 children and 8 grandchildren.

Papers
The Congressional Papers of James L. Oberstar are available for research use.  They include photographs, sound and video recordings, legislative materials, campaign and political activities, committee work, and legislative staff topical files documenting Oberstar's service as a U. S. Representative from Minnesota's 8th Congressional District (1975-2011). The collection emphasizes Oberstar's activities on the House Transportation and Infrastructure Committee, demonstrated by a large series of staff office topical files, which address a wide range of issues, projects, and legislation related to aviation, highways and bridges, railways, waterways, and bike ways. Additional significant content focuses on economic development in the Iron Range, travel and tourism, trade, and environmental protection of Minnesota's land and water resources.

Boards and other affiliations
 Board Member, Board of Trustees, John F. Kennedy Center for the Performing Arts, 1995–2014
 Board Member, Mineta I.I.STPS Institute, San Jose State University, 1995–2014

References

External links
 Official M/V Honorable James L. Oberstar Webpage

 

Profile at SourceWatch
Campaign 2006: Jim Oberstar profile from Minnesota Public Radio

|-

1934 births
2014 deaths
20th-century American politicians
21st-century American politicians
American people of German descent
American people of Slovenian descent
College of Europe alumni
Democratic Party members of the United States House of Representatives from Minnesota
Political chiefs of staff
People from Chisholm, Minnesota
United States congressional aides
University of St. Thomas (Minnesota) alumni
Université Laval alumni